Missing Women is a 1951 American crime film directed by Philip Ford and written by John K. Butler. The film stars Penny Edwards, John Alvin, James Millican, John Gallaudet, James Brown and Robert Shayne. The film was released on February 23, 1951 by Republic Pictures.

Plot

Cast    
Penny Edwards as Claudia Rankin
John Alvin as Eddie Ennis
James Millican as Hans Soderling
John Gallaudet as Det. Kelleher
James Brown as Sgt. Mike Pernell
Robert Shayne as Cincotta
Fritz Feld as Pierre 
Marlo Dwyer as May 'May Berry' Berringer
Ralph Sanford as Sam 
John Hedloe as Phillip Rankin

References

External links
 

1951 films
American crime films
1951 crime films
Republic Pictures films
Films directed by Philip Ford
American black-and-white films
1950s English-language films
1950s American films